Edvard Vilhelm von Düben or Eden (16 August 1865 – 4 March 1930) was a Swedish peer, consul, pharmacist, lieutenant and photographer.

Early life 
Edvard von Düben was born on 16 August 1865 in Ljusne, Söderala, Sweden, to Amelie von Düben (née Westerberg) and Vilhelm von Düben. The fourth and last child in a Noble family. Von Düben spent some years in Landskrona before leaving Sweden, where his family accommodated renown Swedish author Selma Lagerlöf.

Career 
Von Düben sat up a photography business in Landskrona, Scania in the 19th-century.

Von Düben served in the Brazilian army as lieutenant. In addition, he was also running a business in book-printing in Sorocaba, São Paulo.

Von Düben made his way to Mexico after he had stayed in Brazil for some time. While in Mexico von Düben opened a chemical-technical business. The business took off first in Salina Cruz, and later in San Jerónimo in the province of Oaxaca. Von Düben was appointed Swedish vice-consul to Salina Cruz in 1910, and in 1917 he married 19 year old Raymunda Sánchez.

References

External links 

 Photographies by Edvard von Düben

1865 births
1930 deaths
Barons of Sweden
Swedish people of German descent
19th-century Swedish military personnel
Swedish pharmacists
19th-century Swedish photographers
Mexican people of Swedish descent
Brazilian military personnel
Swedish emigrants to Mexico
Düben family